Frank Seeburger (1869-1942) was an American architect who designed many buildings in the state of Pennsylvania.

References

1869 births
1942 deaths
Architects from Philadelphia
20th-century American architects